Tapinoma acuminatum is a species of ant in the genus Tapinoma. Described by Forel in 1907, the species is endemic to Kenya.

References

Tapinoma
Hymenoptera of Africa
Insects described in 1907